Richard Briefer (January 9, 1915 – December 1980) was an American  comic-book artist best known for his various adaptations, including humorous ones, of the Frankenstein monster. Under the pseudonym Dick Hamilton, he also created the superhero team the Target and the Targeteers for Novelty Press.

Biography

Early life and career
Dick Briefer studied at the Art Students League in Manhattan, New York City, and debuted in comic books in 1936 with work in Wow, What A Magazine!, one of the era's proto-comics "Comic books":  tabloid-sized collections of comic strip reprints in color, which would later include occasional new comic strip-like material. Wow was edited by Jerry Iger, and when the comic ceased publication with issue #4 (cover-dated Nov. 1936), Briefer freelanced for the newly formed Eisner & Iger, one of the earliest "packagers" that produced complete comics on demand for publishers entering the fledgling medium.

Briefer's earliest recorded credit is as writer and artist of a five-page story beginning an adaptation of the Victor Hugo novel The Hunchback of Notre Dame, in Jumbo Comics #1-8 & 10 (Sept. 1938 - July 1939 & Nov. 1939), for the Eisner-Iger client Fiction House. Other seminal work includes drawing and possibly writing the science-fiction adventure feature "Rex Dexter of Mars", which ran in several issues of Fox Comics' Mystery Men Comics; "Dynamo" in Fox's Science Comics; "Biff Bannon" in Harvey Comics' Speed Comics; "Storm Curtis" in Prize Comics' Prize Comics; and "Crash Parker" in Fiction House's Planet Comics. For Timely Comics, the precursor of Marvel Comics during the 1930s to 1940s period fans and historians call the Golden Age of Comic Books, Briefer created or co-created (writer credit unknown) the single-appearance superhero the Human Top in Red Raven #1 (Aug. 1940).

Also during this time he also drew the comic strip Pinky Rankin, about a Nazi-fighter, for the American Communist Party newspaper The Daily Worker.

Target and the Targeteers

Briefer, using the pen name Dick Hamilton, created the superhero team the Target and the Targeteers for Novelty Press in 1940. The Target first appeared in Target Comics #10 (Nov. 1940), and the Targeteers the following issue. The team starred in Target Comics through issue #95 / vol. 9, #5 (July 1948). Target itself ran 10 more issues.

Frankenstein

In Prize Comics #7 (Dec. 1940), writer-artist Briefer (using the pseudonym "Frank N. Stein" in the latter role) introduced the eight-page feature "New Adventures of Frankenstein", an updated version of the much-adapted Frankenstein monster created by Mary Shelley in her 1818 novel Frankenstein. Considered by comics historians to be "America's first ongoing comic book series to fall squarely within the horror genre", the feature, set in New York City circa 1930, starred a guttural, rampaging creature actually dubbed "Frankenstein" (unlike Shelley's nameless original monster).

Briefer's better-known version of the Frankenstein monster, however, developed upon the monster's return from the war, in Frankenstein #1 (undated, 1945),  Frankenstein settled into small-town life, becoming a genial neighbor who "began having delightful adventures with Dracula, the Wolfman and other horrific creatures. Briefer, with his trademark "loose and smooth ink and brush skills" began telling stories that would "straddle some amorphous line between pure children's humor and adventure and an adult sensibility about the world".

In his book Art Out of Time: Unknown Comics Visionaries 1900-1969, author Dan Nadel described Briefer as

Briefer's humorous Frankenstein ran through Prize Comics #68 (March 1948), and his humorous Frankenstein ran through issue #17 (Feb. 1949). Three years later, Briefer revived the series with his original, horrific Frankenstein from #18-33 (March 1952 - Nov. 1954).

Later life and career
Following the cancellation of Frankenstein during an era that put much pressure on horror comics and other violent comic books, leading to the creation of the Comics Code, Briefer left the comic industry for commercial advertising art.

At the time of his death, Briefer was living in the Hollywood / Pembroke Pines area of Broward County, Florida.

Reprint collections
 Briefer, Dick. The Monster of Frankenstein (Idea Men Productions, 2006) , 
 Briefer, Dick. Dick Briefer's Frankenstein (Library of Horror Comics' Masters, IDW/Yoe Books, 2010)

References

External links
Frankenstein #32 (vol. 5, #4 per indicia): "The Battle of the Monsters" (dead link;  (reprinted story)
Dick Briefer's Frankenstein (fan site) WebCitation archive.

American comics artists
Golden Age comics creators
1915 births
1980 deaths